Christopher Ussher, the uncle of Archbishop James Ussher,  was Archdeacon of Armagh from 1591 until his death on 25 June 1597.

Notes

1597 deaths
16th-century Irish Anglican priests
Archdeacons of Armagh